Dutaillyea is a genus of flowering plants belonging to the family Rutaceae.

Its native range is the island of New Caledonia.

The genus name of Dutaillyea is in honour of Gustave Dutailly (1846–1906), a French botanist, politician and art collector, it was published and described in Adansonia Vol.10 on page 327 in 1872.

Known species:
Dutaillyea amosensis 
Dutaillyea comptonii 
Dutaillyea trifoliolata

References

Zanthoxyloideae
Plants described in 1872
Flora of New Caledonia
Zanthoxyloideae genera